Mazloom is a Maldivian four-part anthology web series directed by Ilyas Waheed. Produced by Asim Ali and Ilyas Waheed under IFilms and Kazmik International, the series focuses on several societal issues. The first chapter, following the lives of two survivors of rape assaults, stars Nuzuhath Shuaib, Ahmed Ifnaz Firag, Sharaf Abdulla and Washiya Mohamed in pivotal roles.

The second chapter titled Zarrook starring Mohamed Mahil, Sharif and Nathasha Jaleel, narrates the story of a young child connecting with an imaginary friend. The third chapter titled "Minju" follows the life of a victim of domestics abuse (played by Thaathi Adam), who realizes her self-value when her husband (played by Ravee Farooq) was bed-ridden due to a stroke paralyses. The fourth chapter titled "Hintha" stars Mariyam Azza as the victim of human trafficking.

Cast 
Chapter 1: Mazloom
 Nuzuhath Shuaib as Mariyam Zaha Zahir
 Ahmed Ifnaz Firag as Ahmed Maahir
 Sharaf Abdulla as Aidhin
 Washiya Mohamed as Fathimath Zaushan
 Ahmed Sharif as Moosa Fathih
 Ravee Farooq as Investigator
 Hassan Saamih Mohamed
Ibrahim Fairooz Adam

Chapter 2: Zarrook
 Mohamed Mahil as Mahil
 Ahmed Sharif as Moosa Fathih
 Nathasha Jaleel as Niusha
 Ahmed Hameed Adam
 Md. Parvej Alam Rana as Manik

Chapter 3: Minju
 Ravee Farooq as Zaki
 Thaathi Adam as Shamra
 Zuwail Ali Thoriq as Yaan
 Ali Nadheeh as Majidh
 Hassan Saamih Mohamed
 Samah Mohamed
 Aminath Shamra
 Mohamed Afrah
 Aishath Lahufa as Rau
 Mariyam Azza as Hamsha; Zaki's sister

Chapter 4: Hintha
 Mariyam Azza as Hamsha
 Ravee Farooq as Zaki
 Ali Usam as Aroosh
 Aisha Ali as Zara
 Hassan Saamih Mohamed as Shaan
 Aminath Shuha as Shaan's friend
 Ahmed Shamaan Nazeer as Miqdaad
 Aishath Lahufa as Rau; Hamsha's friend
 Fathimath Latheefa as Zara's mother
 Ali Yooshau as Yootte
 Nuzuhath Shuaib as Mariyam Zaha Zahir
 Ahmed Sharif as Moosa Fathih

Episode

Development
After the success of the feature film Bavathi (2019), IFilms announced another venture in June 2021, a short film titled Mazloom produced in association with a newly established film production company, Kazmik International. The project was developed to encourage and support the hard working artists of Maldives during economically uncertain times with regard to COVID-19 pandemic.

Child artist, Mohamed Mahil, who was roped in to star in the second chapter of the series was noticed by the crew from his audition tape to a horror short film. The third chapter of the series titled Minju was announced on 5 October 2021 with the cast Ravee Farooq, Ifnaz's Ali wife, Thaathi Adam and child actor Zuwail Ali Thoriq. Filming for the chapter was completed in October 2021.

Soundtrack

Release and response
On 24 July 2021, it was reported that the first chapter of the series will be made available for streaming through Baiskoafu on 26 July 2021, on the occasion of Maldives Independence Day. The first chapter of the series met with positive reviews from critics. Ahmed Rasheed from MuniAvas praised the performance by each actor separately and noted the remarkable entry scene of Ravee Farooq as a "stellar surprise". Further calling the film a "benchmark project", he was particularly satsitfied with the writing and direction of Ilyas and how he maintained the suspense of the film throughout the chapter. Similarly, the third chapter of the series was met with positive response from critics, where Rasheed was particularly pleased with the performance of debutant Thaathi Adam for "perfectly" portraying the character of a woman suffering from domestic abuse, along with the acting of actor, Farooq. The series was ranked third position at Baiskoafu Original Chart revealed on 3 December 2021.

References

Serial drama television series
Maldivian television shows
Maldivian web series